Dumlupınar TSK is a Turkish Cypriot football club based in Famagusta, Northern Cyprus. It competes in the KTFF Super Lig, the highest level of football in Northern Cyprus and was founded in 1953.

History

In 2016, Dumlupınar TSK formed a consortium with NorthernLand, a local construction company.

Back in 2014, it became the first Turkish Cypriot club to participate in a tournament held in South Cyprus where it fielded it youth teams from the Under-9 to Under-15 categories.

References

Football clubs in Northern Cyprus
Association football clubs established in 1953
1953 establishments in Cyprus